AVL may refer to:

 Automatic vehicle location
 Acadèmia Valenciana de la Llengua (Valencian Language Academy)
 Anti-Villain League, a fictitious international crime fighting organization in the Despicable me media franchise and the movie Minions: The Rise of Gru
 The United Nations Audiovisual Library of International Law
 Asheville Regional Airport in North Carolina, IATA airport code
 Automatic Volume Limiter, limits the volume of a device such as an MP3 or CD player
 AVL tree, a data structure named after inventors Adelson-Velsky and Landis that is used in computer programming
 American Vampire League, a political organization advocating for Vampire rights in the HBO show True Blood.

aVL may refer to:
 Lead augmented vector left (aVL), a voltage difference in electrocardiography